Prospect Heights is a station on Metra's North Central Service in Prospect Heights, Illinois. In Metra's zone-based fare system, Prospect Heights is in zone E. As of 2018, Prospect Heights is the 144th busiest of Metra's 236 non-downtown stations, with an average of 304 weekday boardings.

As of December 12, 2022, Prospect Heights is served by 12 trains (six in each direction) on weekdays.

Bus connections
Pace
 221 Wolf Road

References

External links 

Station House from Google Maps Street View

Metra stations in Illinois
Railway stations in Cook County, Illinois
Railway stations in the United States opened in 1996